Callionima nomius, the fan-tailed bark moth, is a moth of the family Sphingidae. The species was first described by Francis Walker in 1856.

Distribution 
It is found from Mexico and Central America to the north-western half of South America.

Description 
The wingspan is 70–80 mm. It is immediately distinguishable from all other Callionima species by the forewing upperside pattern and hindwing upperside colour. The forewing upperside is deep brown with a pale brown triangular patch on the costa and a silver discal spot represented only by a minute dot. The hindwing upperside is dark brown with a buff base.

Biology 
Adults are on wing year round. Adults nectar at flowers, including Nicotiana forgetiana.

The larvae probably feed on Apocynaceae species, possibly including Aspidosperma macrocarpa.

References

N
Moths of Central America
Sphingidae of South America
Moths described in 1856